Pre-Code Hollywood is the era in the American film industry between the introduction of sound (talkies) in the late 1920s and the enforcement of the Motion Picture Production Code (Hays Code) censorship guidelines. Although the Code was adopted in 1930, oversight was poor and it did not become effectively enforced until July 1, 1934. Before that date, movie content was restricted more by local laws, negotiations between the Studio Relations Committee (SRC) and the major studios, and popular opinion than strict adherence to the Hays Code, which was often ignored by Hollywood filmmakers.

The criterion for inclusion on this list is the direct mention or discussion of the film as pre-Code in a mainstream source.

Movies

1928

Lights of New York

1929

Alibi
Applause
The Awful Truth
Big News
Big Time 
The Black Watch 
Broadway
The Broadway Melody
Bulldog Drummond 
The Canary Murder Case 
Captain Lash
Careers
Close Harmony
The Cock-Eyed World
The Cocoanuts
Condemned 
Coquette
Dance Hall
The Delightful Rogue
The Desert Song
Devil-May-Care
Diary of a Lost Girl 
The Flying Fleet
Footlights and Fools 
The Four Feathers
The Godless Girl
Gold Diggers of Broadway
Glorifying the American Girl
The Great Gabbo 
Half Marriage
Hallelujah
Hell's Heroes
Her Private Life
High Voltage
The Hole in the Wall
The Idle Rich
In Old Arizona 
The Lady Lies
The Last of Mrs. Cheyney
The Letter
The Locked Door
Lucky Star 
Madame X
Marianne (musical)
The Mysterious Dr. Fu Manchu
Our Modern Maidens
The Pagan
Painted Faces
Pointed Heels
The Racketeer
Redskin
Rio Rita
The River
Sally
Salute
Street Girl
The Saturday Night Kid 
Seven Footprints to Satan 
The Single Standard 
The Squall
Sunny Side Up
Their Own Desire
The Thirteenth Chair
This Thing Called Love
Thunderbolt
The Trespasser
The Trial of Mary Dugan
Untamed
The Valiant 
The Virginian
Voice of the City
Where East Is East 
The Wild Party 
The Wolf of Wall Street
The Wolf Song

1930

Africa Speaks
All Quiet on the Western Front
Animal Crackers
Anna Christie
Anybody's Woman
The Arizona Kid
The Bad Man 
The Big House 
The Bat Whispers
Beau Bandit
The Big Pond
The Big Trail 
Billy the Kid 
The Bishop Murder Case
The Blue Angel
Born Reckless
Bride of the Regiment
Bright Lights 
Call of the Flesh
Captain Thunder 
Charley's Aunt 
Chasing Rainbows
Cheer Up and Smile
Children of Pleasure
City Girl
Clancy in Wall Street
Conspiracy 
The Cuckoos
Danger Lights
The Dawn Patrol
The Devil to Pay! 
A Devil with Women
The Devil's Holiday
Dixiana 
The Divorcee
The Doorway to Hell
Doughboys
Du Barry, Woman of Passion
Fast and Loose
Feet First
Follow Thru
For the Defense
Golden Dawn 
Good News
The Green Goddess
Half Shot at Sunrise
Hell Harbor
Hell's Angels
Hell's Heroes
High Society Blues
Hold Everything
Holiday
In Gay Madrid
Inside the Lines
Just Imagine 
King of Jazz 
Kismet
Ladies Love Brutes 
Ladies of Leisure
The Lady of Scandal
The Lash
Laughter
Leathernecking
Let Us Be Gay
Let's Go Native 
The Life of the Party
Liliom
Loose Ankles 
The Lottery Bride
The Love Parade
Madame Satan
Mammy
The Man from Blankley's
Manslaughter
The Matrimonial Bed
Maybe It's Love
The Melody Man
Men Without Women
Min and Bill
Moby Dick
Montana Moon
Monte Carlo
Morocco
Murder!
New Moon
No, No, Nanette 
Not So Dumb
The Office Wife
Oh Sailor Behave
One Night at Susie's
One Romantic Night 
Our Blushing Brides
Outward Bound
Paid
The Pay-Off
Paramount on Parade 
Peacock Alley
Playing Around
Puttin' On the Ritz 
Queen High
Raffles
Reaching for the Moon
Redemption
Renegades
Road to Paradise
Romance
The Rogue Song 
Rough Romance
The Royal Family of Broadway
The Runaway Bride 
Safety in Numbers
Sarah and Son 
The Second Floor Mystery
She Couldn't Say No
Show Girl in Hollywood
The Silver Horde
Sin Takes a Holiday 
The Sins of the Children
Sinners' Holiday
Slightly Scarlet 
Son of the Gods
Song of the Flame
Song of the West
The Spoilers
Street of Chance
Strictly Unconventional
Sunny
Sweet Kitty Bellairs
They Learned About Women
Three Faces East
Tol'able David
True to the Navy 
The Truth About Youth
Under a Texas Moon
Up the River 
The Unholy Three
The Vagabond King 
Viennese Nights
The Virtuous Sin
War Nurse 
Way for a Sailor
What a Widow!
The Woman Racket 
Whoopee!
Young Man of Manhattan

1931
 
Alexander Hamilton
Ambassador Bill
An American Tragedy
Arizona
Arrowsmith
Bachelor Apartment
Bad Company
Bad Girl
Bad Sister 
Beyond Victory
Big Business Girl
The Blonde Captive
Blonde Crazy
Body and Soul 
Born to Love
Bought!
Broadminded
Captain Applejack
Caught Plastered 
The Champ
Chances
The Cheat 
Cimarron
City Lights 
City Streets
The Common Law 
Compromised 
Confessions of a Co-Ed
A Connecticut Yankee 
Cracked Nuts
The Criminal Code
Dance, Fools, Dance
Daybreak
Delicious 
Dirigible
Dishonored
Dr. Jekyll and Mr. Hyde
Dracula
The Easiest Way
Everything's Rosie
Expensive Women
Fifty Million Frenchmen
Fighting Caravans
Five and Ten
Five Star Final
Flying High
Frankenstein
A Free Soul
Friends and Lovers
The Front Page
The Gay Diplomat 
Gentleman's Fate
Girls About Town
Girls Demand Excitement
God's Gift to Women 
Goldie
The Great Lover
The Guilty Generation
Guilty Hands
Hell Divers
Her Majesty, Love
His Woman
A Holy Terror
Honor Among Lovers
A House Divided
Hush Money 
I Like Your Nerve
I Take This Woman
Illicit
Indiscreet
Inspiration
Iron Man
It Pays to Advertise 
Kept Husbands 
Kick In
Kiki
Ladies' Man
Ladies of the Big House
The Lady Refuses
The Last Flight
Laughing Sinners
Little Caesar
Local Boy Makes Good
Lonely Wives
M
The Mad Genius 
The Mad Parade 
Mädchen in Uniform 
Maker of Men
The Maltese Falcon
Man of the World
The Man Who Came Back
Manhattan Parade 
Mata Hari
Men Call It Love 
Men of Chance 
Merely Mary Ann
Millie 
The Millionaire
The Miracle Woman 
Monkey Business 
Morals for Women 
Never the Twain Shall Meet
Night Nurse
No Limit
Once a Lady 
Other Men's Women
Palmy Days
Peach O'Reno
The Phantom of Paris
Platinum Blonde
Possessed
Private Lives
The Public Defender
The Public Enemy
Quick Millions
The Road to Singapore
Safe in Hell
The Secret Six
The Sin of Madelon Claudet
The Sin Ship
Sit Tight 
Six Cylinder Love 
Smart Money
Smart Woman
The Smiling Lieutenant
Son of India
Sporting Blood
The Squaw Man 
Strangers May Kiss
Street Scene 
Strictly Dishonorable 
Surrender
Susan Lenox (Her Fall and Rise)
Svengali 
Tarnished Lady
Ten Cents a Dance 
Tonight or Never
Too Many Cooks
Trader Horn
Transatlantic 
Traveling Husbands
Under Eighteen 
The Unholy Garden 
Up Pops the Devil 
Waterloo Bridge
Way Back Home
West of Broadway
The Woman Between
Women of All Nations

1932

 
20,000 Years in Sing Sing
Afraid to Talk
After Tomorrow 
The Age of Consent 
Air Mail
Alias the Doctor 
American Madness
Attorney for the Defense
The Animal Kingdom
Are You Listening?
Arsène Lupin
As You Desire Me
Bachelor's Affairs
Back Street
The Beast of the City
The Big Broadcast
Big City Blues
The Big Timer
A Bill of Divorcement 
Bird of Paradise 
Blessed Event
Blonde Venus
Blondie of the Follies 
Broken Lullaby
The Cabin in the Cotton
Call Her Savage
Central Park
The Crash
The Crowd Roars 
Cynara 
The Dark Horse
The Devil is Driving
Devil and the Deep
Disorderly Conduct
Divorce in the Family 
Doctor X
Downstairs
Emma 
Faithless 
The Famous Ferguson Case
A Farewell to Arms
Fast Life
The First Year
Flesh
Forbidden 
Freaks
Frisco Jenny 
Girl Crazy 
The Girl from Chicago
Grand Hotel
The Greeks Had a Word for Them
The Half-Naked Truth
The Hatchet Man
The Heart of New York
Hell's Highway
Hell's House
High Pressure
Hold 'Em Jail 
Horse Feathers
Hot Saturday
I Am a Fugitive From a Chain Gang
If I Had a Million
Impatient Maiden 
Island of Lost Souls
It's Tough to Be Famous
Jewel Robbery
The Kid from Spain
Klondike
Kongo
Lady and Gent
Lady with a Past 
The Last Mile (1932 film) 
Lawyer Man
Letty Lynton
Life Begins
The Lost Squadron
Love Affair
Love Is a Racket
Love Me Tonight
Madame Butterfly
Madame Racketeer
Man Wanted
The Man Who Played God
The Mask of Fu Manchu
The Match King
Me and My Gal
Men of Chance
Merrily We Go to Hell
Million Dollar Legs 
The Miracle Man
Mr. Robinson Crusoe
The Most Dangerous Game
The Mouthpiece 
The Mummy
Murders in the Rue Morgue
New Morals for Old
Night After Night
Night World 
No Man of Her Own 
No More Orchids
No One Man
The Old Dark House
Old Morals for New
One Hour with You
One Way Passage
Panama Flo
Payment Deferred
The Penguin Pool Murder
The Phantom President 
Polly of the Circus 
Prestige
Probation
The Purchase Price 
Rain
Rasputin and the Empress 
Red Dust
Red-Headed Woman
The Rich Are Always with Us
Roar of the Dragon
Rockabye
Scarface
Scarlet Dawn
Shanghai Express
Shopworn
The Sign of the Cross
The Silent Witness
Silver Dollar
Sinners in the Sun
Sky Devils
Skyscraper Souls
Smilin' Through
So Big! 
Speak Easily
The Sport Parade 
State's Attorney 
Strange Interlude
Strange Justice
The Strange Love of Molly Louvain
A Successful Calamity
Symphony of Six Million
Tarzan the Ape Man
Taxi! 
Ten Minutes to Live
Tess of the Storm Country
That's My Boy
Thirteen Women
The Thirteenth Guest
This Is the Night
This Reckless Age 
Three on a Match
Three Wise Girls
Trouble in Paradise
Two Against the World
Two Kinds of Women
Vanity Fair 
Virtue
The Washington Masquerade
Week-End Marriage
Week Ends Only
Westward Passage
The Wet Parade
What Price Hollywood
White Zombie
Wild Girl
The Wiser Sex
Winner Take All
You Said a Mouthful
Young America

1933

42nd Street
Ace of Aces
After Tonight 
Air Hostess
Ann Carver's Profession 
Ann Vickers
Another Language 
Baby Face
The Barbarian
Beauty for Sale
Bed of Roses
Before Dawn
The Bitter Tea of General Yen
Blind Adventure
Blondie Johnson
Blood Money
Bombshell
The Bowery
Brief Moment
Broadway Through a Keyhole
Broadway to Hollywood 
Bureau of Missing Persons 
Captured!
Cavalcade
Central Airport
The Chief
Child of Manhattan
Christopher Strong
College Coach
College Humor
Convention City
Counsellor at Law
Dancing Lady
Day of Reckoning
Design for Living
The Devil's Brother 
Dinner at Eight
Diplomaniacs 
Doctor Bull
Double Harness
Duck Soup
The Eagle and the Hawk
Elmer, the Great
The Emperor Jones
Employees' Entrance
Ever in My Heart 
Ex-Lady
Fast Workers
Female
Flying Devils
Flying Down to Rio
Footlight Parade
From Headquarters
From Hell to Heaven
Gabriel Over the White House
Gambling Ship
The Ghoul
Girl Missing
Girl Without a Room
Going Hollywood
Gold Diggers of 1933
Goodbye Again
Goodbye Love
Hallelujah, I'm a Bum
Hard to Handle
Havana Widows
Headline Shooter
Hell Below 
Hello, Sister!
Heroes for Sale
Hold Your Man
Hoop-La
Hot Pepper 
The House on 56th Street 
I Am Suzanne
I Cover the Waterfront
I'm No Angel
The Invisible Man
International House
It's Great to Be Alive
Jennie Gerhardt
The Kennel Murder Case
King Kong
King of the Jungle
The Kiss Before the Mirror
Ladies They Talk About
Lady Killer
Laughter in Hell
The Life of Jimmy Dolan
Lilly Turner
The Little Giant 
The Mad Game
Made on Broadway
Man's Castle
The Masquerader
The Mayor of Hell
Meet the Baron 
Melody Cruise
Men Must Fight
Midnight Club 
Midnight Mary 
Morning Glory
Murders in the Zoo
Myrt and Marge
Mystery of the Wax Museum
My Weakness
The Narrow Corner
Night Flight
No Other Woman
One Man's Journey
One Sunday Afternoon
Only Yesterday
Our Betters
Parachute Jumper
Parole Girl
The Past of Mary Holmes
Peg o' My Heart
Penthouse
Perfect Understanding
Pick-Up
Picture Snatcher 
The Power and the Glory 
Private Detective 62
The Private Life of Henry VIII
The Prizefighter and the Lady
Professional Sweetheart
Queen Christina
Rafter Romance
The Right to Romance
Roman Scandals
Sailor's Luck
Saturday's Millions
Scarlet River
Secret of the Blue Room
Secrets 
Sensation Hunters
Shanghai Madness 
She Done Him Wrong
She Had to Say Yes
Should Ladies Behave
A Shriek in the Night
The Silver Cord
The Sin of Nora Moran
Sitting Pretty
So This Is Africa
Sons of the Desert
The Secret of Madame Blanche
The Song of Songs
Stage Mother
State Fair
The Story of Temple Drake
The Stranger's Return
Sucker Money
Supernatural
This Day and Age
Three-Cornered Moon
To the Last Man
Today We Live
Too Much Harmony
Topaze 
Torch Singer
Tugboat Annie
Turn Back the Clock
The Vampire Bat 
Voltaire
The Warrior's Husband
West of Singapore
When Ladies Meet
Whistling in the Dark 
The White Sister
White Woman
Wild Boys of the Road
The Woman Accused
The Women in His Life 
The Working Man
The World Changes
The World Gone Mad 
You Made Me Love You
Zoo in Budapest

1934

A Very Honorable Guy
The Affairs of Cellini
All of Me
Bachelor Bait 
The Barretts of Wimpole Street 
Bedside
Belle of the Nineties
The Big Shakedown
The Black Cat
Black Moon
Bolero
Born to Be Bad 
Bottoms Up 
The Captain Hates the Sea
Carolina
The Cat and the Fiddle
Chained
Change of Heart 
Chloe, Love Is Calling You
The Circus Clown
Cleopatra
The Crime Doctor
Dames
Dark Hazard
Death Takes a Holiday 
Dr. Monica
Evelyn Prentice 
Fashions of 1934
Finishing School
Fog Over Frisco 
Forsaking All Others
Four Frightened People
Fugitive Lovers
Gambling Lady
The Gay Bride
The Gay Divorcee
George White's Scandals 
The Girl from Missouri 
Hat, Coat, and Glove
Heat Lightning 
He Was Her Man
Here Comes the Navy
Hide-Out
Hi Nellie!
Hips, Hips, Hooray!
Hollywood Party
The House of Rothschild
I Sell Anything
Imitation of Life
It Happened One Night
I've Got Your Number
Jimmy the Gent 
Journal of a Crime
Keep 'Em Rolling
Lady by Choice
Laughing Boy
Lazy River
The Life of Vergie Winters
Liliom
Little Man, What Now?
Little Miss Marker
Long Lost Father
The Lost Patrol 
The Man with Two Faces
Mandalay
Madame Du Barry
Maniac
Manhattan Love Song
Manhattan Melodrama
Massacre
Men in White
The Merry Widow 
Midnight
Midnight Alibi 
A Modern Hero
Moulin Rouge
Murder at the Vanities
Murder on the Blackboard 
The Mystery of Mr. X 
Nana
No Greater Glory
Now I'll Tell
Of Human Bondage
Once to Every Woman
One More River
Operator 13
The Painted Veil
Palooka 
The Personality Kid
The Richest Girl in the World
Riptide
The Road to Ruin
Sadie McKee 
The Scarlet Empress
Search for Beauty
She Loves Me Not
She Made Her Bed
The Show-Off 
Side Streets
Sing and Like It
Six of a Kind
Smarty
Social Register
Spitfire 
Stamboul Quest
Stand Up and Cheer!
Stingaree
Strictly Dynamite 
Success at Any Price 
Tarzan and His Mate
The Thin Man
Thirty Day Princess
This Man Is Mine 
Tomorrow's Children
The Trumpet Blows 
Twentieth Century
Twenty Million Sweethearts
Two Alone
Upper World 
A Very Honorable Guy
Viva Villa!
We're Not Dressing
We're Rich Again
West of the Divide
Wharf Angel
Where Sinners Meet
The Woman Condemned
Wonder Bar

See also

Pre-Code Hollywood
Pre-Code crime films
Pre-Code sex films
Motion Picture Production Code

Notes

Sources

Doherty, Thomas Patrick. Pre-Code Hollywood: Sex, Immorality, and Insurrection in American Cinema 1930-1934. New York: Columbia University Press 1999. 
Jacobs, Lea. The Wages of Sin: Censorship and the Fallen Woman Film, 1928-1942. Madison: University of Wisconsin Press 1997 
Jeff, Leonard L, & Simmons, Jerold L. The Dame in the Kimono: Hollywood, Censorship, and the Production Code. The University Press of Kentucky 2001 
LaSalle, Mick. Complicated Women: Sex and Power in Pre-Code Hollywood. New York: St. Martin's Press 2000 
LaSalle, Mick. Dangerous Men: Pre-Code Hollywood and the Birth of the Modern Man. New York: Thomas Dunne Books 2002 
Leitch, Thomas. Crime Films. Cambridge University Press 2004 
Lewis, Jen. Hollywood V. Hard Core: How the Struggle Over Censorship Created the Modern Film Industry. NYU Press 2002 
Prince, Stephen. Classical Film Violence: Designing and Regulating Brutality in Hollywood Cinema, 1930-1968. Rutgers University Press 2003 
Smith, Sarah. Children, Cinema and Censorship: From Dracula to the Dead End Kids. Wiley-Blackwell 2005 
Vieira, Mark A. Sin in Soft Focus: Pre-Code Hollywood. New York: Harry N. Abrams, Inc. 1999.

External links
List of Pre-Code movies

History of film
Film censorship in the United States
pre-Code